Serhiy Anatoliyovych Protsyuk (born 7 February 1963) is a former Soviet and Ukrainian professional footballer.

Club career
He made his debut in the Soviet Top League in 1988 for FC Chornomorets Odesa.

In 1983 Protsyuk took part in the Summer Spartakiad of the Peoples of the USSR in the team of Ukrainian SSR.

Honours
 Soviet Top League bronze: 1990.
 Ukrainian Premier League bronze: 1993.

References

1963 births
Footballers from Kyiv
Living people
Soviet footballers
Ukrainian expatriate footballers
Expatriate footballers in Russia
Ukrainian expatriate sportspeople in Russia
Expatriate footballers in Finland
Ukrainian expatriate sportspeople in Finland
Ukrainian footballers
FC Ros Bila Tserkva players
FC Bukovyna Chernivtsi players
FC Chornomorets Odesa players
FC Dynamo Moscow players
Soviet Top League players
Ukrainian Premier League players
Association football midfielders
Association football defenders
FC Dynamo Kyiv players
CS Tiligul-Tiras Tiraspol players
NK Veres Rivne players
FC Naftovyk-Ukrnafta Okhtyrka players
FC Nosta Novotroitsk players